Worthing Borough Council is a district council in the county of West Sussex, based in the borough of Worthing.  The borough council was created in 1974 under the Local Government Act 1972 out of the existing Worthing Municipal Council, which also had borough status.  It forms the lower tier of local government in Worthing, responsible for local services such as housing, planning, leisure and tourism.  Since 2014 it has been a constituent council of the Greater Brighton City Region.

It is composed of 37 councillors, three for each of 11 electoral wards and two each for the electoral wards of Durrington and Northbrook wards. The council is currently led by the  Labour Party, who have 23 councillors; the opposition consists of 13 Conservative councillors, and one Liberal Democrat councillor. Dr Catherine Howe is the chief executive. Many of the council's staff are based at Worthing Town Hall.

History

Worthing Town Commissioners (1803–1865)
The early town was run by 72 town commissioners following the Worthing Town Improvement Act of 1803. The first chairman of the commissioners was Timothy Shelley, who chaired the first meeting at the Nelson Inn on South Street.  Commissioners were elected by ratepayers rather than the general population of the town.  Their remit was to raise rates for the purpose of providing pavements, lighting, the disposal of sewage and a local police force.  Following further Acts in 1809 and 1821 further powers were given to commissioners, who established a market between Market Street and Ann Street in 1810.  Further activities included laying down, widening, and paving streets and building a new road from Worthing to South Lancing.

From 1812, town commissioners met at the Royal George at the corner of Market Street and George Street until Worthing's first purpose-built town hall was built in 1835.

Worthing Board of Health (1865–1890)
The Worthing Local Board of Health replaced the commissioners as Worthing's local government in 1852.

Worthing Town Council (1890–1974)
In 1890 Worthing and the new town of West Worthing were incorporated by charter as the borough of Worthing.  Six aldermen and 18 councillors, including the mayor, at first represented five wards.  In 1902 the borough of Worthing expanded to include parts of Broadwater and West Tarring. In 1929 the borough of Worthing expanded to include Goring and Durrington and in 1933 the borough of Worthing expanded again to include the west of Sompting and the south of Findon.

Alfred Cortis was Worthing's first mayor. One notable councillor was Frederick Linfield, who was one of the first councillors when Worthing was incorporated as a borough in 1890 and was mayor of Worthing twice, from 1906 to 1908.  Linfield went on to become Liberal MP for Mid Bedfordshire.

In 1910 Ellen Chapman became Worthing's first woman councillor and one of the first women councillors in the UK.  She subsequently became the first female Mayor of Worthing in 1920.

The Labour Party first put up candidates in Worthing in 1919, and its first councillor, Charles Barber, was elected to Broadwater ward in 1922.  Worthing was the first town in the UK to establish a branch of the conservative Middle Class Union, largely made up, in Worthing, of retired army personnel.  An MCU candidate, Colonel Connolly, was elected in 1921.  The elections of Connolly and Barber brought about an end to the tradition in Worthing of non-party participation in elections.

On 31 March 1930, Charles Bentinck Budd was elected to the Offington ward of the West Sussex County Council. Later that year, Budd, who lived at Greenville, Grove Road, was elected to the town council as the independent representative of Ham Ward in Broadwater.  At an election meeting on 16 October 1933, Budd revealed he was now a member of the British Union of Fascists (BUF). He was duly re-elected and the national press reported that Worthing was the first town in the country to elect a fascist councillor.  Street confrontations took place culminating on 9 October 1934 when anti-fascist protesters met outside a blackshirt rally at the Pavilion Theatre in what became known as the Battle of South Street.

Between 1933 and 1939 the Worthing Corporation purchased  of downland to the north of Worthing, which forms the Worthing Downland Estate.  In 1939 the Worthing Corporation purchased  acres of land at High Salvington.  This land adjoined another  acres that were purchased around the same time.

Worthing's new town hall was opened in 1933. The first Labour mayor, Charles Barber, was selected in 1936. After the 1950s the corporation had a Conservative majority.

Worthing Borough Council (1974 onwards)
The borough council was formed in 1974, under the Local Government Act 1972.  The borough of Worthing became a district with borough status granted by a new charter. In 1976 30 councillors still represented 10 wards, but aldermen had been abolished.

In 2017 Alex Bailey also became Director of Innovation and Infrastructure’ at the Coastal West Sussex NHS Clinical Commissioning Group, in addition to his role as Chief Executive of Worthing Borough Council and Adur District Council.

On 18 July 2019, Worthing Borough Council declared a climate emergency, which aims to see the council carbon-neutral by 2030.

The  Labour Party took control of the council for the first time in 2022.

Joint administration with Adur District Council

Since 2008 Worthing Borough Council has worked in partnership with Adur District Council, as Adur and Worthing Councils, sharing a joint management structure, with a single Chief Executive.

Composition

For electoral purposes, the borough is divided into 13 wards: Broadwater, Castle, Central, Durrington, Gaisford, Goring, Heene, Marine, Northbrook, Offington, Salvington, Selden, and Tarring. There are thirty-seven borough councillors with two councillors assigned to Durrington and Northbrook wards and three councillors assigned to each other ward.  The party composition of the council is  23 Labour, 13 Conservative, and 1 Liberal Democrat.

The highest non-elected official is the Chief Executive, Dr Catherine Howe, who is also the joint Chief Executive of Adur District Council.

Historical composition
Historical compositions are as follows:

Political control

Councillors

Wards
The Borough consists of 13 wards, each of which is represented by three Councillors, except for Durrington and Northbrook wards which have two members each. Since boundaries were revised in 2002 these have been:

For full election results see Worthing Borough Council elections.

Leadership roles
A new mayor and deputy mayor are elected every May by the full Council at its annual general meeting. The current mayor is Councillor Henna Chowdhury, the borough's first female Muslim mayor and the borough's first Labour mayor since the 1930s. The mayor's duties are almost entirely ceremonial, although the mayor chairs meetings for the full Council.

The leader of the Council is Councillor Rebecca Cooper (Labour) and the Deputy Leader is Councillor Carl Walker (Labour).

The official opposition is the Conservative Party, with Councillor Kevin Jenkins leading that group.

Coat of arms

The borough's coat of arms includes three silver mackerel, a Horn of Plenty overflowing with corn and fruit on a cloth of gold, and the figure of a woman, considered likely to be Hygieia, the ancient Greek goddess of health, holding a snake. The images represent the health given from the seas, the fullness and riches gained from the earth and the power of healing.
Worthing's motto is the Latin Ex terra copiam e mari salutem, which translates as 'From the land plenty and from the sea health'.  The borough's coat of arms was created in 1890 after it received borough status.  Designed by Mr TR Hyde the arms were only granted officially by the College of Arms in 1918 and were formally granted in 1919.

See also
Adur and Worthing Councils
 Worthing Borough Council elections
 History of local government in Sussex
 West Sussex County Council
 Worthing Rural District

Bibliography

References

Local authorities in West Sussex
Worthing
Non-metropolitan district councils of England